Cârligu River may refer to:

 Cârligu, a tributary of the Șușița in Gorj County
 Cârligu, a tributary of the Zlata in Hunedoara County

See also 
 Cârligele River (disambiguation)
 Cârlig (disambiguation)